Alphonse Louis Pierre Pyramus (or Pyrame) de Candolle (28 October 18064 April 1893) was a French-Swiss botanist, the son of the Swiss botanist Augustin Pyramus de Candolle.

Biography

De Candolle, son of Augustin Pyramus de Candolle, first devoted himself to the study of law, but gradually drifted to botany and finally succeeded to his father's chair at the University of Geneva. He published a number of botanical works, including continuations of the Prodromus in collaboration with his son, Casimir de Candolle. Among his other contributions is the formulation, based on his father's work for the Prodromus, of the first Laws of Botanical Nomenclature, which was adopted by the International Botanical Congress in 1867, and was the prototype of the current ICN.

He was elected a foreign member of the Royal Swedish Academy of Sciences in 1859 and was awarded the Linnean Medal of the Linnean Society of London in 1889. He was elected a foreign member of the Royal Netherlands Academy of Arts and Sciences in 1878.
He is also known for a study of the religious affiliations of foreign members of the French and British Academies of Science during the Scientific Revolution that demonstrated that in both academies Protestants were more heavily represented than Catholics by comparison with catchment populations. This observation continues to be used (for example in David Landes' 1999 Wealth and Poverty of Nations, cf. revised paperback edition, 177) as a demonstration that Protestants were more inclined to be scientifically active during the Scientific Revolution than Roman Catholics.

In 1855 de Candolle published Géographie botanique raisonnée. This was a ground-breaking book that for the first time brought together the large mass of data being collected by the expeditions of the time. The natural sciences had become highly specialized, yet this book synthesized them to explain living organisms within their environment, and why plants were distributed the way they were, all upon a geologic scale. This book had a significant impact upon Harvard botanist Asa Gray.

Works 

 
  (First edition in French)
 
 Candolle, Alphonse de - Lois de la nomenclature botanique adoptées par le Congrès international de botanique tenu à Paris en août 1867... Genève et Bale: H. Georg; Paris: J.-B. Baillière et fils, 1867. 64 p.
 Candolle, Alphonse de (Membre Corr. de l'Acad. Sciences, Paris; Foreign Member, Royal Soc, etc.) - Histoire des Sciences et des Savants depuis deux Siècles. Geneva, 1873.
 Candolle, Alphonse de. (1882). Darwin considéré au point de vue des causes de son succès et de l'importance de ses travaux. Genève: H. Georg.

References

Bibliography 

 Works available at Botanicus

External links

1806 births
1893 deaths
Swiss entomologists
Botanists with author abbreviations
Academic staff of the University of Geneva
Foreign associates of the National Academy of Sciences
Foreign Members of the Royal Society
Members of the Royal Netherlands Academy of Arts and Sciences
Members of the Royal Swedish Academy of Sciences
Corresponding members of the Saint Petersburg Academy of Sciences
Recipients of the Pour le Mérite (civil class)
19th-century French botanists
19th-century Swiss botanists
Members of the Royal Society of Sciences in Uppsala